Polina Ghrighorievna Astakhova (Полина Григорьевна Астахова, 30 October 1936 – 5 August 2005) was a Soviet and Ukrainian artistic gymnast. She won ten medals at the 1956, 1960 and 1964 Summer Olympics.

Biography

Astakhova became interested in artistic gymnastics at age 13, after she had watched the gymnastics championships in Donetsk, where their family moved a short time before. She trained in the local gymnastics sports club Shakhtyor under Vladimir Alieksandrovitch Smirnov.

Astakhova earned a nickname The Russian Birch in Western countries for her exceptional grace, and at the 1960 Olympics she was even called Madonna by the Italian journalists. Between 1956 and 1966 Astakhova was on top of many international and national competitions especially on the uneven bars apparatus event. She was a member of the USSR team between 1955 and 1968.

In 1954 Astakhova competed in the USSR Championships for the first time and in a year she made the USSR National team at the 1956 Summer Olympics. She was the youngest team member and contributed to the team's gold. At the 1960 Summer Olympics in Rome she led in the all-around, but lost a whole point for a fall on beam, which was the seventh routine of eight contested. She was very disappointed by the accident and even did not compete that year, although in Rome she won the gold in the team competition and on the bars, silver on the floor and bronze in the all-around. She recovered after the 1961 European Championships, where she won gold medals on the bars and on beam. Competing in the 1964 Summer Olympics, Astakhova contributed to the team's gold, won on the bars, was second on the floor and third in the all-around. She became the first gymnast to defend her Olympic gold medal in the uneven bars event. Her feat was only matched in 2000 by Svetlana Khorkina and later in 2016 by Aliya Mustafina.

After retiring from competitions, since 1972 Astakhova worked as a national coach in Ukraine. In 2002, she was inducted into the International Gymnastics Hall of Fame. Astakhova spent the last years of her life in Kyiv before her death at age 68 from pneumonia.

Non-Olympic achievements

See also

List of multiple Olympic medalists
List of top Olympic gymnastics medalists
List of Olympic female gymnasts for the Soviet Union
List of multiple Summer Olympic medalists

References

External links

 Polina Astakhova at Gymn-Forum.net
 
 
 

1936 births
2005 deaths
Soviet female artistic gymnasts
Honoured Masters of Sport of the USSR
Recipients of the Order of Princess Olga, 3rd class
Recipients of the Order of the Red Banner of Labour
Olympic gold medalists for the Soviet Union
Olympic silver medalists for the Soviet Union
Olympic bronze medalists for the Soviet Union
Olympic gymnasts of the Soviet Union
Olympic medalists in gymnastics
Gymnasts at the 1956 Summer Olympics
Gymnasts at the 1960 Summer Olympics
Gymnasts at the 1964 Summer Olympics
Sportspeople from Zaporizhzhia
Medalists at the World Artistic Gymnastics Championships
European champions in gymnastics
Avanhard (sports society) sportspeople
Medalists at the 1964 Summer Olympics
Medalists at the 1960 Summer Olympics
Medalists at the 1956 Summer Olympics
Burials at Baikove Cemetery